Lex, Rex is a book by the Scottish Presbyterian minister Samuel Rutherford.  The book, written in English, was published in 1644 with the subtitle "The Law and the Prince".  Published in response to Bishop John Maxwell's "Sacro-Sancta Regum Majestas", it was intended to be a comprehensive defence of the Scottish Presbyterian ideal in politics.  The book defends the rule of law and the lawfulness of defensive wars (including pre-emptive wars) and advocates limited government and constitutionalism in politics and the "Two Kingdoms" theory of Church-State relations (which advocated distinct realms of church and state but opposed religious toleration).  Rutherford's Lex, Rex utilizes arguments from Scripture, Natural Law and Scottish law, and along with the sixteenth century Vindiciae contra tyrannos, it attacked royal absolutism and emphasized the importance of the covenant and the rule of law (by which Rutherford included Divine Law and Natural Law as well as positive law).  After the Restoration, the authorities cited Rutherford for high treason, but his death intervened before the charge could be tried.  Lex, Rex itself was burned in Edinburgh (the Scottish capital) and St. Andrews (where Rutherford had been principal of the university) and in 1683 Oxford University included it in what ended up being the last official book-burning in England.

The attack on absolutism, the defence of the rule of law and the emphasis on the importance of the covenant made Lex, Rex a precursor to the social contract idea, and helped pave the way for the political theory of John Locke. However, Rutherford's views on Church-State relations and his opposition to religious toleration were not shared by Locke.

See also 
Alexander Shields
Lex animata (law individualised in a prince)
Natural law
Rule of law
Rule of man

External links
 .
 .
 .

1644 books
Books in political philosophy